The War of the Worlds was a series of professional wrestling events, produced every year since 2014 by professional wrestling promotions Ring of Honor (ROH) and New Japan Pro-Wrestling (NJPW). The War of the Worlds events are shown on the online streaming services of both promotions, Honor Club and NJPW World.

History
The two promotions announced a partnership in February 2014, which led to the first War of the Worlds event taking place at the Hammerstein Ballroom, in New York City, the following May. The event then became a series of events, with two in 2015, three in 2016, and four since 2017. The events have visited numerous cities and metropolitan areas around the U.S. and Canada, such as New York City, Philadelphia, Detroit, Toronto, Boston and Chicago.

In 2017, as a one-off, ROH and NJPW partnered with Revolution Pro Wrestling (RPW) and Consejo Mundial de Lucha Libre (CMLL) to promote a War of the Worlds tour in the United Kingdom, named War of the Worlds UK.

Dates and venues

See also
Global Wars
Honor Rising: Japan
G1 Special in USA

References

External links
Official New Japan Pro-Wrestling website 
Official Ring of Honor website